Chandan K Anand (born 23 October 1980) is a Mumbai based actor and a certified Reiki practitioner. He was born in New Delhi and has his hometown in New Delhi. Anand began acting after completing his high school education in 1997.

Filmography

Films

TV Shows

Web series

References 

Living people
21st-century Indian male actors
1980 births